Eochionelasmus is a genus of symmetrical sessile barnacles in the family Chionelasmatidae. There are at least two described species in Eochionelasmus.

Species
These species belong to the genus Eochionelasmus:
 Eochionelasmus ohtai Yamaguchi, 1990
 Eochionelasmus paquensis Yamaguchi & Newman, 1997

References

External links

 

Barnacles